Arrieros de Antioquia is a Colombian basketball club from Medellín. Founded in 1993, the team plays in the Baloncesto Profesional Colombiano. The club has won four national championships, in 1993, 1996, 2001 and 2010.

The team played in the 2011 Liga Sudamericana de Básquetbol as "Orgullo Paisa".

Honours
Baloncesto Profesional Colombiano
Champions (4): 1993, 1996, 2001, 2010

Players

Notable players

 Heissler Guillent (1 year: 2009)
 Cedric Miller (1 year: 2006)
Basketball teams in Colombia
1993 establishments in Colombia
Basketball teams established in 1993
Sport in Medellín